The WCT Tournament of Champions (also Shakeys Tournament of Champions for sponsorship purposes in 1977 and 1978) is a defunct men's tennis tournament that was held on the WCT Tour from 1977–1990. It was held in Lakeway, Texas in 1977, Las Vegas, Nevada in 1978, Dorado Beach, Puerto Rico in 1979, and Forest Hills, New York City from 1980–1990.

The tournament commenced in early May each year. Ivan Lendl won the event a record four times. The US achieved a consistent level of success at the event, with seven of the thirteen tournaments won by Americans. Between 1982 and 1985 it was a major ranking tournament as part of the Grand Prix Super Series.

The 1990 edition was the final tournament played in the 23-year history of World Championship Tennis as the organization announced its dissolution the day after the final.

Results

Singles

Doubles

See also
WCT Finals

References

External links
ITF Search (search ToC)

Clay court tennis tournaments
Defunct tennis tournaments in the United States
ATP Tour
World Championship Tennis
1977 establishments in Texas
1990 disestablishments in New York (state)
Recurring sporting events established in 1977
Recurring events disestablished in 1990